Swing's the Thing is an album by American jazz saxophonist Illinois Jacquet, recorded in late 1956 and released on the Clef label.

Reception

AllMusic reviewer Thom Jurek observed: "the magic is in the performances, so to speak with Jacquet, Roy Eldridge, Jo Jones, Herb Ellis, Jimmy Jones and Ray Brown in the party... This is essential Jacquet."

Track listing
 "Las Vegas Blues" (Roy Eldridge) - 6:17
 "Harlem Nocturne" (Earle Hagen, Dick Rodgers) - 4:31 	
 "Can't We Be Friends?" (Paul James, Kay Swift) - 6:42 	
 "Achtung" (Illinois Jacquet) - 5:06
 "Have You Met Miss Jones?" (Richard Rodgers, Lorenz Hart) - 5:56
 "Lullaby of the Leaves" (Bernice Petkere, Joe Young) - 5:44

Personnel 
Illinois Jacquet - tenor saxophone
Roy Eldridge - trumpet
Jimmy Jones - piano
Herb Ellis - guitar
Ray Brown - bass
Jo Jones - drums

References 

1956 albums
Illinois Jacquet albums
Clef Records albums
Verve Records albums
Albums produced by Norman Granz